The piquillo pepper is a variety of chili, Capsicum annuum, having a sweet taste with little to no heat, fruits about 7 cm long, well suited for growing in pots, that is traditionally grown in Northern Spain near the town of Lodosa. Its name is derived from the Spanish for "little beak".

Preparation 
Typically, the peppers are hand-picked during two harvest seasons between September and December. They are roasted over embers, which gives them a distinct sweet, spicy flavour, more akin to bell peppers than chilli peppers, despite their small size. They are then peeled and again grilled in a grill bar for extra flavour and texture then marinated with salt, pepper, and olive oil and then de-seeded by hand, before being packed into jars or tins for sale. Piquillo peppers are often stuffed with meat, seafood, or cheese, and served as tapas.

Nutrition 
Piquillo peppers are high in fiber and vitamins C, E, A, and B. In particular, their vitamin C content is very high, comparable to a citrus fruit.

References 

Chili peppers
Spanish cuisine